Issame Charaï (born May 11, 1982, Merksem) is a retired Moroccan footballer and currently manager of Morocco U23, who also holds Belgian citizenship.

Coaching career

Al-Faisaly
After his playing career in 2012, he immediately became an assistant coach at Al-Faisaly FC under newly appointed Belgian manager Marc Brys who Charaï previously had worked together with at Berchem Sport. The duo left Saudi Arabia at the end of 2013.

Beerschot
In July 2016, Charaï once again became Brys' assistant coach, this time at K Beerschot VA. After two seasons, they left the club.

Sint-Truidense
At the end of May 2018, Brys was announced manager of Sint-Truidense V.V. and took Charaï with him again as his assistant. On 26 November 2019, Brys and his staff, including Charaï, was fired.

OH Leuven
In the summer 2020, Charaï joined Oud-Heverlee Leuven, once again as an assistant to Marc Brys.

References

External links

1982 births
Living people
Belgian footballers
Association football midfielders
People from Merksem
K. Berchem Sport players
Lierse S.K. players
K.F.C. Verbroedering Geel players
K.V. Mechelen players
Sint-Truidense V.V. players
K.V.K. Tienen-Hageland players
Challenger Pro League players
Belgian Pro League players
Al-Faisaly FC managers
Oud-Heverlee Leuven non-playing staff